The UEFA European Under-18 Championship 1977 Final Tournament was held in Belgium. The team from Belgium defeated the team from Bulgaria in the Championship match to win the Championship.

Qualification

Groups 1-12

|}

Group 13

Group 14

Teams
The following teams qualified for the tournament:

 
  (host)
 
 
 
 
 
 
 
  (did not have to qualify)

Group stage

Group A

Group B

Group C

Group D

Semifinals

Third place match

Final

External links
Results by RSSSF

UEFA European Under-19 Championship
1977
1976–77 in Belgian football
Under-18
UEFA European Under-18 Championship
UEFA European Under-18 Championship